Phayer or Phaer is a surname. Notable people with the surname include:

Michael Phayer (born 1935), American historian
Thomas Phaer (alternate spelling Phayer,  1510–1560), English lawyer, pediatrician, and author

See also
Fayer